Dhangu or Dhaŋu may be,

Dhangu people
Dhangu language
Operation Dhangu